Kamsa may refer to:

Kamsa in Hinduism, half-brother of Devaki, and ruler of the Vrishni kingdom 
Camsá language or Kamsa language
Kamsa and Bar Kamsa or Kamtza and Bar Kamtza, famous midrash (legend) regarding the destruction of the Second Temple in Jerusalem in the 1st century 
Kamsa, Tibet,  a village in Tibet, China